The Windeyer family is a prominent family in the Australian legal profession. Members of the family include:   
 Charles Windeyer (1780–1855), father of Richard (1806-1847), first Mayor of Sydney and magistrate.
 Margaret Windeyer (1866–1939) daughter of William Charles and  Mary, librarian and women's rights campaigner
 Mary Windeyer (1836–1912) wife of William Charles, mother of Margaret, Richard (1868–1959) and William Archibald, women's rights campaigner
 Richard Windeyer (1806–1847), son of Charles, barrister
 Richard Windeyer (barrister) (1868–1959) son of William Charles and  Mary, barrister
 Victor Windeyer (1900–1987), son of Richard (1868–1959), Justice of the High Court of Australia and Judicial Committee of the Privy Council.
 William Archibald Windeyer (1871–1943) son of William Charles and Mary, solicitor
 William Charles Windeyer (1834–1897) son of Richard (1806-1847), Attorney-General of New South Wales and Judge of the Supreme Court of New South Wales
 William Victor Windeyer, President of Law Society of New South Wales and Judge of the Supreme Court of New South Wales.

References

Australian families
Legal families of Australia